Spinney is a 2-member ward within Kettering Borough Council, in Northamptonshire, England.

It was established in boundary changes before the 1999 elections. The ward was last fought at Borough Council level in the 2003 local council elections, in which both seats were held by the Conservatives.

The most recent councillors prior to the Ward's abolition were Cllr. Bob Civil and Cllr. Matthew Lynch.

Councillors
Kettering Borough Council Elections 2003
Cllr. Bob Civil (Conservative)
Cllr. Matthew Lynch (Conservative)

Kettering Borough Council Elections 1999
Cllr. Bob Civil (Conservative)
Cllr. Matthew Lynch (Conservative)

Election results

Kettering Borough Council Elections 2003

(Vote count shown is ward average)

Kettering Borough Council Elections 1999
This seat was established in boundary changes implemented at the time of this election

(Vote count shown is ward average)

See also
Kettering
Kettering Borough Council

Electoral wards in Kettering